Anthony A. Apodaca is Director of Graphics Research and Development at Pixar. He is co-creator of the RenderMan Interface Specification (RISpec). His film credits include almost all of the titles produced by Pixar.

Bibliography
Anthony A. Apodaca, Larry Gritz: Advanced RenderMan: Creating CGI for Motion Pictures, Morgan Kaufmann Publishers,

External links
 

Computer graphics professionals
Living people
Year of birth missing (living people)
Place of birth missing (living people)
Pixar people